The theory of tides is the application of continuum mechanics to interpret and predict the tidal deformations of planetary and satellite bodies and their atmospheres and oceans (especially Earth's oceans) under the gravitational loading of another astronomical body or bodies (especially the Moon and Sun).

History

Australian Aboriginal astronomy 
The Yolngu people of northeastern Arnhem Land in the Northern Territory of Australia identified a link between the Moon and the tides, which they mythically attributed to the Moon filling with water and emptying out again.

Classical era
The tides received relatively little attention in the civilizations around the Mediterranean Sea, as the tides there are relatively small, and the areas that experience tides do so unreliably. A number of theories were advanced, however, from comparing the movements to breathing or blood flow to theories involving whirlpools or river cycles. A similar "breathing earth" idea was considered by some Asian thinkers. Plato reportedly believed that the tides were caused by water flowing in and out of undersea caverns. An ancient Indian Purana text dated to 400-300 BC refers to the ocean rising and falling because of heat expansion from the light of the Moon.

Ultimately the link between the Moon (and Sun) and the tides became known to the Greeks, although the exact date of discovery is unclear; references to it are made in sources such as Pytheas of Massilia in 325 BC and Pliny the Elder's Natural History in 77 AD. Although the schedule of the tides and the link to lunar and solar movements was known, the exact mechanism that connected them was unclear. Seneca mentions in De Providentia the periodic motion of the tides controlled by the lunar sphere. Eratosthenes (3rd century BC) and Posidonius (1st century BC) both produced detailed descriptions of the tides and their relationship to the phases of the Moon, Posidonius in particular making lengthy observations of the sea on the Spanish coast, although little of their work survived. The influence of the Moon on tides was mentioned in Ptolemy's Tetrabiblos as evidence of the reality of astrology. Seleucus of Seleucia is thought to have theorized around 150 BC that tides were caused by the Moon as part of his heliocentric model.

Aristotle, judging from discussions of his beliefs in other sources, is thought to have believed the tides were caused by winds driven by the Sun's heat, and he rejected the theory that the Moon caused the tides. An apocryphal legend claims that he committed suicide in frustration with his failure to fully understand the tides. Philostratus discusses tides in Book Five of Life of Apollonius of Tyana (circa 217-238 AD); he was vaguely aware of a correlation of the tides with the phases of the Moon but attributed them to spirits moving water in and out of caverns, which he connected with the legend that spirits of the dead cannot move on at certain phases of the Moon.

Medieval period
The Venerable Bede discusses the tides in The Reckoning of Time and shows that the twice-daily timing of tides is related to the Moon and that the lunar monthly cycle of spring and neap tides is also related to the Moon's position. He goes on to note that the times of tides vary along the same coast and that the water movements cause low tide at one place when there is high tide elsewhere. However, he made no progress regarding the question of how exactly the Moon created the tides.

Medieval rule-of-thumb methods for predicting tides were said to allow one "to know what Moon makes high water" from the Moon's movements. Dante references the Moon's influence on the tides in his Divine Comedy.

Medieval European understanding of the tides was often based on works of Muslim astronomers, which became available through Latin translation starting from the 12th century. Abu Ma'shar al-Balkhi, in his Introductorium in astronomiam, taught that ebb and flood tides were caused by the Moon. Abu Ma'shar discussed the effects of wind and Moon's phases relative to the Sun on the tides. In the 12th century, al-Bitruji contributed the notion that the tides were caused by the general circulation of the heavens. Medieval Arabic astrologers frequently referenced the Moon's influence on the tides as evidence for the reality of astrology; some of their treatises on the topic influenced western Europe. Some theorized that the influence was caused by lunar rays heating the ocean's floor.

Modern era
Simon Stevin in his 1608 De spiegheling der Ebbenvloet (The Theory of Ebb and Flood) dismisses a large number of misconceptions that still existed about ebb and flood. Stevin pleads for the idea that the attraction of the Moon was responsible for the tides and writes in clear terms about ebb, flood, spring tide and neap tide, stressing that further research needed to be made. In 1609, Johannes Kepler correctly suggested that the gravitation of the Moon causes the tides, which he compared to magnetic attraction basing his argument upon ancient observations and correlations.

In 1616, Galileo Galilei wrote Discourse on the Tides. He strongly and mockingly rejects the lunar theory of the tides, and tries to explain the tides as the result of the Earth's rotation and revolution around the Sun, believing that the oceans moved like water in a large basin: as the basin moves, so does the water. Therefore, as the Earth revolves, the force of the Earth's rotation causes the oceans to "alternately accelerate and retardate". His view on the oscillation and "alternately accelerated and retardated" motion of the Earth's rotation is a "dynamic process" that deviated from the previous dogma, which proposed "a process of expansion and contraction of seawater." However, Galileo's theory was erroneous.  In subsequent centuries, further analysis led to the current tidal physics. Galileo tried to use his tidal theory to prove the movement of the Earth around the Sun. Galileo theorized that because of the Earth's motion, borders of the oceans like the Atlantic and Pacific would show one high tide and one low tide per day. The Mediterranean Sea had two high tides and low tides, though Galileo argued that this was a product of secondary effects and that his theory would hold in the Atlantic. However, Galileo's contemporaries noted that the Atlantic also had two high tides and low tides per day, which led to Galileo omitting this claim from his 1632 Dialogue.

René Descartes theorized that the tides (alongside the movement of planets, etc.) were caused by aetheric vortices, without reference to Kepler's theories of gravitation by mutual attraction; this was extremely influential, with numerous followers of Descartes expounding on this theory throughout the 17th century, particularly in France. However, Descartes and his followers acknowledged the influence of the Moon, speculating that pressure waves from the Moon via the aether were responsible for the correlation.

Newton, in the Principia, provides a correct explanation for the tidal force, which can be used to explain tides on a planet covered by a uniform ocean but which takes no account of the distribution of the continents or ocean bathymetry.

Dynamic theory
While Newton explained the tides by describing the tide-generating forces and Daniel Bernoulli gave a description of the static reaction of the waters on Earth to the tidal potential, the dynamic theory of tides, developed by Pierre-Simon Laplace in 1775, describes the ocean's real reaction to tidal forces. Laplace's theory of ocean tides takes into account friction, resonance and natural periods of ocean basins. It predicts the large amphidromic systems in the world's ocean basins and explains the oceanic tides that are actually observed.

The equilibrium theory—based on the gravitational gradient from the Sun and Moon but ignoring the Earth's rotation, the effects of continents, and other important effects—could not explain the real ocean tides. Since measurements have confirmed the dynamic theory, many things have possible explanations now, like how the tides interact with deep sea ridges, and chains of seamounts give rise to deep eddies that transport nutrients from the deep to the surface.  The equilibrium tide theory calculates the height of the tide wave of less than half a meter, while the dynamic theory explains why tides are up to 15 meters.  
Satellite observations confirm the accuracy of the dynamic theory, and the tides worldwide are now measured to within a few centimeters. Measurements from the CHAMP satellite closely match the models based on the TOPEX data.  Accurate models of tides worldwide are essential for research since the variations due to tides must be removed from measurements when calculating gravity and changes in sea levels.

Laplace's tidal equations

In 1776, Laplace formulated a single set of linear partial differential equations for tidal flow described as a barotropic two-dimensional sheet flow. Coriolis effects are introduced as well as lateral forcing by gravity. Laplace obtained these equations by simplifying the fluid dynamics equations, but they can also be derived from energy integrals via Lagrange's equation.

For a fluid sheet of average thickness D, the vertical tidal elevation ζ, as well as the horizontal velocity components u and v (in the latitude φ and longitude λ directions, respectively) satisfy Laplace's tidal equations:

where Ω is the angular frequency of the planet's rotation, g is the planet's gravitational acceleration at the mean ocean surface, a is the planetary radius, and U is the external gravitational tidal-forcing potential.

William Thomson (Lord Kelvin) rewrote Laplace's momentum terms using the curl to find an equation for vorticity. Under certain conditions this can be further rewritten as a conservation of vorticity.

Tidal analysis and prediction

Harmonic analysis

Laplace's improvements in theory were substantial, but they still left prediction in an approximate state. This position changed in the 1860s when the local circumstances of tidal phenomena were more fully brought into account by William Thomson's application of Fourier analysis to the tidal motions as harmonic analysis. Thomson's work in this field was further developed and extended by George Darwin, applying the lunar theory current in his time. Darwin's symbols for the tidal harmonic constituents are still used.

Darwin's harmonic developments of the tide-generating forces were later improved when A.T. Doodson, applying the lunar theory of E.W. Brown, developed the tide-generating potential (TGP) in harmonic form, distinguishing 388 tidal frequencies.  Doodson's work was carried out and published in 1921. Doodson devised a practical system for specifying the different harmonic components of the tide-generating potential, the Doodson numbers, a system still in use.

Since the mid-twentieth century further analysis has generated many more terms than Doodson's 388.  About 62 constituents are of sufficient size to be considered for possible use in marine tide prediction, but sometimes many fewer can predict tides to useful accuracy.  The calculations of tide predictions using the harmonic constituents are laborious, and from the 1870s to about the 1960s they were carried out using a mechanical tide-predicting machine, a special-purpose form of analog computer.

Tidal constituents

Tidal constituents combine to give an endlessly varying aggregate because of their different and incommensurable frequencies: the effect is visualized in an animation of the American Mathematical Society illustrating the way in which the components used to be mechanically combined in the tide-predicting machine.  Amplitudes (half of peak-to-peak amplitude) of tidal constituents are given below for six example locations:
Eastport, Maine (ME), Biloxi, Mississippi (MS), San Juan, Puerto Rico (PR), Kodiak, Alaska (AK), San Francisco, California (CA), and Hilo, Hawaii (HI).

Semi-diurnal

Diurnal

Long period

Short period

Doodson numbers
In order to specify the different harmonic components of the tide-generating potential, Doodson devised a practical system which is still in use, involving what are called the Doodson numbers based on the six "Doodson arguments" or Doodson variables. The number of different tidal frequencies is large, but they can all be specified on the basis of combinations of small-integer multiples, positive or negative, of six basic angular arguments. In principle, the basic arguments can be specified in numerous ways; Doodson's choice of his six "Doodson arguments" has been widely used in tidal work. In terms of these Doodson arguments, each tidal frequency can then be specified as a sum made up of a small integer multiple of each of the six arguments. The resulting six small integer multipliers effectively encode the frequency of the tidal argument concerned, and these are the Doodson numbers: in practice all except the first are usually biased upwards by +5 to avoid negative numbers in the notation. (In the case that the biased multiple exceeds 9, the system adopts X for 10, and E for 11.)

The Doodson arguments are specified in the following way, in order of decreasing frequency:

 is 'Mean Lunar Time', the Greenwich Hour Angle of the mean Moon plus 12 hours.

 is the mean longitude of the Moon.

 is the mean longitude of the Sun.

 is the longitude of the Moon's mean perigee.

 is the negative of the longitude of the Moon's mean ascending node on the ecliptic.

  is the mean anomaly of the Moon (distance from its perigee).
 is the mean anomaly of the Sun (distance from its perigee).
  is the Moon's mean argument of latitude (distance from its node).
  is the Moon's mean elongation (distance from the sun).

It is possible to define several auxiliary variables on the basis of combinations of these.

In terms of this system, each tidal constituent frequency can be identified by its Doodson numbers. The strongest tidal constituent "M2" has a frequency of 2 cycles per lunar day, its Doodson numbers are usually written 255.555, meaning that its frequency is composed of twice the first Doodson argument, and zero times all of the others. The second strongest tidal constituent "S2" is influenced by the sun, and its Doodson numbers are 273.555, meaning that its frequency is composed of twice the first Doodson argument, +2 times the second, -2 times the third, and zero times each of the other three.  This aggregates to the angular equivalent of mean solar time +12 hours. These two strongest component frequencies have simple arguments for which the Doodson system might appear needlessly complex, but each of the hundreds of other component frequencies can be briefly specified in a similar way, showing in the aggregate the usefulness of the encoding.

See also
Long-period tide
Lunar node#Effect on tides
Kelvin wave
Tidal table

Notes

References

External links

Contributions of satellite laser ranging to the studies of earth tides
Dynamic Theory of Tides
Tidal Observations
 Publications from NOAA's Center for Operational Oceanographic Products and Services
 Understanding Tides
 150 Years of Tides on the Western Coast
 Our Relentless Tides

Tides
Geophysics
Oceanography
Continuum mechanics
Fluid dynamics
Fluid mechanics
Planetary science